The Amur sculpin (Mesocottus haitej), also known as the Ussuri sculpin, is a species of freshwater ray-finned fish belonging to the family Cottidae, the typical sculpins. This species is found in eastern Asia where it is found in Russia, China and Mongolia - in the Amur River basin and some adjacent territories (the Tugur and the Uda Rivers flowing into the Sea of Okhotsk north from the Amur River, north-west of Sakhalin Island opposite the mouth of the Amur River). This species is the only known member of its genus, Mesocottus. According to the result of a pilot phylogenetic analysis, the freshwater Mesocottus is a sister lineage to the Cottus clade.

References

Cottinae

Fish described in 1869